Capture the Sun is the second studio album of the American hard rock supergroup Hollywood Monsters. This album features Steph Honde and Vinny Appice (Black Sabbath) and includes 12 brand new tracks with a bonus track  Fool For Your Loving.

Track listing 

Tracks:-

Personnel 
Hollywood Monsters

References 

2016 albums
Hard rock albums by American artists